A Song for You was a Canadian music variety television series which aired on CBC Television from 1962 to 1964.

Premise
This Winnipeg-produced series featured musician Jose Poneira (piano and vocals) whose quartet featured James Cordepal (bass), Lenny Breau (guitar) and Robert Gross (drums). Alternate weeks included singer Maxine Ware. Each episode was based on a style of music or a particular theme which was supported by various songs and visiting guest artists.

Scheduling
The first season of this 15-minute series was broadcast on Saturdays at 6:30 p.m. (Eastern) from 7 July to 15 September 1962. From that point, it aired Sundays at 1:00 p.m., then at 12:30 p.m. from 6 October to 29 December 1963. Its final run was broadcast Saturdays 6:30 p.m. from 4 April to 27 June 1964.

References

External links
 

CBC Television original programming
1962 Canadian television series debuts
1964 Canadian television series endings
Television shows filmed in Winnipeg